Wu Zhongchao (born 1946) is a Chinese theoretical physicist and professor at Zhejiang University of Technology.

Career
In 1963, Wu Zhongchao enrolled in the University of Science and Technology of China. In 1968, as part of a Cultural Revolution program, he was sent to work in a factory for five years. In 1971, he returned to the university as a teacher. In 1979, recommended by physicist Qian Linzhao, he went to Cambridge University in the United Kingdom to study theoretical physics with theoretical physicist Stephen Hawking. He mainly studied the very early universe. He received a doctorate from Cambridge University in 1984, and his doctoral thesis was titled "Cosmological models and the inflationary universe".

Wu's dissertation on the dimensionality of space and time won the third prize in the 1985 Gravity Research Foundation dissertation competition.

In 2002, Wu established the Institute of Astrophysics at Zhejiang University of Technology.

Wu has translated Hawking's books into Chinese. In 2001, he translated A Brief History of Time and in 2011 he released a Chinese translation of The Grand Design. When Hawking visited China in 1985, 2002 and 2006 Wu served as his interpreter.

References

1946 births
University of Science and Technology of China alumni
Academic staff of the University of Science and Technology of China
Alumni of the University of Cambridge
Academic staff of Zhejiang University of Technology
Living people
Physicists from Fujian
People from Fuzhou
Educators from Fujian